Victor Parizot (18?? – 26 March 1860) was a 19th-century French composer. With Ernest Bourget and Paul Henrion, he was one of the founders of the SACEM (Société des auteurs, compositeurs et éditeurs de musique).

French composers
Year of birth missing
1860 deaths